Aleksandr Alexandrovich Kolpakov ((born 15 February 1943 in Buzuluk,  Orenburg Oblast, RSFSR, Soviet Union) is a Soviet and Russian guitarist, singer and composer.

Biography 
Coming from a Servo family, a group of Romani people found mostly in Russia and Ukraine, he started playing a seven string guitar at an early age while living in the region of Saratov. Having moved twenty years ago to Moscow, he played in several groups but worked mostly in the Romen Theatre, the only Romani theater in existence in the world.

Kolpakov also engages in independent projects, such as playing with the Kolpakov Trio, the first Russian Romani ensemble to tour North America in the post-communist period. His nephew, Vadim Kolpakov has mastered the seven-string guitar and has been a member of the Kolpakov Trio since 1994.

As a soloist and composer, Rodava Tut is Sasha's first record, published by Opre, a Swiss label dedicated to the promotion of Romani music. His music is typical of what one could listen to while spending an evening at home with Roma. Some of the songs are several hundred years old.

External links 
 
 Sasha Kolpakov's bio in Guitarists and Compositors Illustrated Encyclopedia (in Russian)

1943 births
Living people
Servitka Roma
Russian musicians
Russian Romani people
Romani guitarists
Romani singers